The 1940 Oregon Webfoots football team represented the University of Oregon ass a member of the Pacific Coast Conference (PCC) during the 1940 college football season.  In their third season under head coach Tex Oliver, the Webfoots compiled a 4–4–1 record (3–4–1 in PCC, fifth), and outscored their opponents, 100 to 58.

Three home games were played on campus at Hayward Field in Eugene and one at Multnomah Stadium in Portland.

Schedule

References

External links
 Game program: Oregon at Washington State – October 26, 1940
 WSU Libraries: Game video – Oregon at Washington State – October 26, 1940

Oregon
Oregon Ducks football seasons
Oregon Webfoots football